Daphne petraea is a shrub, of the family Thymelaeaceae. It is endemic to Italy.

Description
The shrub may grow either with a prostrate or an erect habit.  It grows to a height of 15 cm.  It also has pink or red flowers which grow to be 9 to 15 mm long and 6 to 10 mm wide.

References

petraea